Geraldine is a town in DeKalb County, Alabama, United States. It was incorporated in February 1957. At the 2020 census, the population was 910.

Mayors
Raymond Upton served from 1956-1960, L.M. Bailey served from 1960-1964, C.C. Lowrey served from 1964-1976, Dave Turner served from 1976-1984 & from 1988-1992, T.A. Shellhorse served from 1984-1988, Roy Wilborn served from 1992-2000, Billy Smothers served from 2000-2012, and John "Chuck" Ables is currently serving in his 3rd term that started in 2012.

Geography
Geraldine is located at  (34.353654, -86.004002). The town is located atop Sand Mountain, about halfway between Rainsville to the northeast and Albertville to the southwest. State Route 75 and State Route 227 intersect near the center of town.

Governing body
The current Mayor of Geraldine is John "Chuck" Ables. He is currently serving in his 3rd term as Mayor. The Town Council consists of Mayor Chuck Ables, Mayor Pro Tem. Larry Lingerfelt, Stanley Rooks, Melissa Gilbert, Scott Tarrant, and Tony Taylor. The Chief of Police is Heath Albright.

Demographics

As of the 2010 census Geraldine had a population of 896.  The racial and ethnic composition of the population was 92.5% non-Hispanic white, 0.3% black or African American, 3.7% Native American, 0.7% from some other race, 1.8% from two or more races (1.6% of whom reported Native American as one of their races) and 2.0% Hispanic or Latino of any race.

As of the census of 2000, there were 786 people, 351 households, and 230 families residing in the town. The racial makeup of the town was 97.96% White, 1.15% Native American, and 0.89% from two or more races. 0.38% of the population were Hispanic or Latino of any race.

There were 351 households, out of which 24.8% had children under the age of 18 living with them, 52.4% were married couples living together, 10.3% had a female householder with no husband present, and 34.2% were non-families. 32.2% of all households were made up of individuals, and 20.5% had someone living alone who was 65 years of age or older. The average household size was 2.24 and the average family size was 2.81.

In the town, the population was spread out, with 21.2% under the age of 18, 8.0% from 18 to 24, 26.5% from 25 to 44, 22.9% from 45 to 64, and 21.4% who were 65 years of age or older. The median age was 41 years. For every 100 females, there were 78.6 males. For every 100 females age 18 and over, there were 78.4 males.

The median income for a household in the town was $24,028, and the median income for a family was $34,583. Males had a median income of $27,083 versus $20,179 for females. The per capita income for the town was $18,330. About 12.1% of families and 17.0% of the population were below the poverty line, including 17.4% of those under age 18 and 20.3% of those age 65 or over.

Education
Geraldine School (K-12), "home of the Bulldogs," is a  member of the DeKalb County School System. As of May 2009, Geraldine is classified as a 3A high school. That same month, approximately 65 students graduated from Geraldine. On average, the school produces 50-100 graduating students each year. The current principal is Jason Mayfield.

Notable people
Damon Johnson, guitarist, vocalist and songwriter
Andrew Pope, country music singer and songwriter
Pat Upton, Spiral Starecase singer, guitarist and songwriter

References

External links

Geraldine Alabama - Homepage of Geraldine, Alabama

Towns in DeKalb County, Alabama
Towns in Alabama
1957 establishments in Alabama